The Fox Valley Conference is an IHSA recognized high school extracurricular conference including the following schools, generally located in the northern part of the Fox River basin in Illinois. The conference regularly produces strong athletic teams, including 6A Football State Champions Prairie Ridge (2016-17) and Cary-Grove (2018, 2021); 2017 4A State Baseball Champion Crystal Lake South; and 2019 4A State Softball Champion Huntley.

Schools
The conference consists of 10 teams total. All enrollments and classifications are from the Illinois High School Association website.

Previous Members

Membership Timeline

Changes
 Dundee Community High School and Irving Crown High School, both charter members of the FVC, consolidated to become Dundee-Crown at the start of the 1983–84 school year.
 Lake Zurich joined the conference in 1991–92.
 Grayslake (now known as Grayslake Central) joined in 1997–98.  Prairie Ridge opened this year and joined the conference as well.
 Huntley joined in 2003–04.  (This led to a scheduling issue for the football season.  With 11 schools in the conference, it was impossible to have each school play all 10 other conference opponents because the football regular season is only 9 games.)
 Lake Zurich left to join the North Suburban Conference after the 2004–05 school year.
 Johnsburg and Grayslake North joined in 2006–07.  The 12 schools were split into two divisions: the smaller schools (Crystal Lake Central, Grayslake Central, Grayslake North, Huntley, Johnsburg, Prairie Ridge) in the Fox Division, and the larger schools (Cary-Grove, Crystal Lake South, Dundee-Crown, Jacobs, McHenry, Woodstock) in the Valley Division.
 Woodstock North joined in 2009–10, being placed in the Fox Division. With Woodstock's enrollment split in half due to Woodstock North opening, it moved down to the Fox Division, and Huntley moved up to the Valley Division.
 Hampshire joined in 2011–12. They joined the Fox Division, and Prairie Ridge moved into the Valley Division.
 Johnsburg left to join the Big Northern Conference in 2014–15.  Prairie Ridge moved back into the Fox Division.
 Woodstock and Woodstock North left in 2016–17 to become charter members of the Kishwaukee River Conference.  Grayslake North and Grayslake Central also left this same year to become charter members of the Northern Lake County Conference.  With only 9 remaining schools, the FVC eliminated its division format.
 Central joined in 2019–20.

State championships 
There have been 27 total IHSA State Championships earned by members of the FVC.

Football 

 Woodstock
 1983–84 4A
 1997–98 5A
 Cary-Grove
 2009–10 6A
 2018–19 6A
2021–22 6A
 Prairie Ridge
 2011–12 6A
 2016–17 6A
 2017–18 6A

Volleyball (girls) 

 Crystal Lake Central
 2007–08 3A
 Cary-Grove
 2009–10 4A

Cross country (boys) 

 Crystal Lake Central
 1995–96 AA
 Grayslake Central
 2015–16 2A

Golf (boys) 

 Crystal Lake South
 1980–81 AA

Soccer (boys) 

 Prairie Ridge
 1999–00 A
 Crystal Lake South
 2018–19 2A

Competitive cheerleading 

 Hampshire
 2014–15 M
Crystal Lake Central
2021–22 M

Competitive dance 

 Crystal Lake Central
 2012–13 2A

Gymnastics (girls) 

 Prairie Ridge
 2014–15
 2015–16
 2016–17
 2019–20
 2021–22

Baseball 

 Prairie Ridge
 2007–08 4A
 Crystal Lake South
 2016–17 4A

Softball 

 Huntley
 2018–19 4A

Journalism 

 Huntley
 2021–22

Notes

References

External links
 Illinois High School Association

High school sports conferences and leagues in the United States
Illinois high school sports conferences
High school sports in Illinois